Raamdhenu is a 2011 Indian Assamese romantic drama film directed by veteran Munin Barua and produced by Pride East Entertainments Private Limited. It stars an ensemble cast of Jatin Bora, Prastuti Parashar, Tapan Das, Utpal Das and Nishita Goswami in the lead roles. The film was released in 24 cinema halls across Assam on 4 February 2011. The music is composed by Jatin Sharma.

Raamdhenu was commercially hit in the box office.
The songs in this film are sung by popular singers like Zubeen Garg, Angaraag Mahanta, Dikshu, Zublee, Shreya Ghoshal, Raaj J Konwar, Rupjyoti and Sunidhi Chauhan.

Synopsis 
It is a story of few characters who suffered many challenges in their life. Difficult circumstances and adversities invade the lives of the characters in the film who deal with the circumstances bravely and endeavour to establish stability in their lives. The story revolves around the lives of 7 individuals, whose lives and it's adversities intersect with each other. 7 individuals, 7 different stories also mean the 7 colours, which come together into becoming Raamdhenu (Rainbow).

Cast 
 Jatin Bora as Arjun
 Prastuti Parashar as Mandira Kakoti
 Jayanta Das as Nooruddin Ali Ahmed Hazarika 
 Utpal Das as Rajiv
 Nishita Goswami as Pooja 
 Bishnu Kharghoria as Landlord 
 Tapan Das as Ajoy Shankar Baruah
 Bidyut Chakrabarty as Sanjeev Dutta
 Pakeeza Begum
 Pabitra Baruah

Soundtrack

The music of Raamdhenu is composed by Jatin Sharma. The songs of Raamdhenu were huge hit. Singers from Bollywood like Shreya Ghoshal and Sunidhi Chauhan lent their voices in this film.

References

External links 
 

2011 films
Films set in Assam
Films directed by Munin Barua
2010s Assamese-language films